Strong box or strongbox may refer to:

A type of box
 Strong box, a strongly built and secured casket (decorative box)
 Safe, a strongly built and secured metal box

Arts, entertainment, and media
 "The Strongbox" (1998 TV episode), the 170th episode of Seinfeld
 The Strongbox Chronicles, a book written as Cate Dermody by C. E. Murphy

Computing and technology
 Strongbox, the former name of SecureDrop, a secure communications platform

See also 
 Lockbox (disambiguation)
 Safe (disambiguation)
 Treasure Box (disambiguation)
 Treasure chest (disambiguation)